Cameron Bancroft (born May 17, 1967), sometimes credited as Cam Bancroft, is a Canadian television actor from Winnipeg, Manitoba, Canada.

Early life and career
Bancroft was born in Winnipeg. He graduated from Handsworth Secondary School in North Vancouver and attended the California Institute of the Arts in Santa Clarita, California.

Career 
Bancroft is best known for playing Joe Bradley on the television series Beverly Hills, 90210. He was on the show from 1995 to 1996, and in the same year played Astronaut Zeke Beaumont in The Cape. In 2003, he joined his Beverly Hills alumni, Jason Priestley and Emma Caulfield, in Reality of Love. He played the male leading role in Code Name: Eternity in 1999 and 2000. In 2005, Bancroft guest-starred in season four of 24. He played field agent Lee Castle in nine episodes.

Bancroft has made numerous guest appearances on several television series. In 2005, he starred as Charles Ingalls in the television miniseries Little House on the Prairie. He also played the demon Cryto in the Charmed season two episode "How to Make a Quilt Out of Americans".

In 2007, he starred in the award-winning movie Country Remedy as a workaholic single parent and Chicago doctor named Evan Gibbs. In order to secure the job of a lifetime, he must first set up a clinic in a small mountain town in North Carolina.

In 2012, for the entirety of the second season of Blackstone, Bancroft portrayed the role of Dr. Kurt Ellis, a doctor who treats the Blackstone reservation and has an affair with Debbie Fraser. In Supernatural, he played the role of Dr. Gaines who was taken over by a Leviathan. He appeared in three episodes as this monstrous creature/doctor. In 2013 he played Ben, a star widower, in Garage Sale Mystery.

In 2014, he played Spencer in The Town that Came A-Courtin. He played a supporting role in several episodes of the Canadian TV series The Beachcombers.

Filmography

Film

Television

External links

References 

Canadian male television actors
Living people
1967 births
Male actors from Winnipeg
California Institute of the Arts alumni